is a railway station located in Kitakyūshū, Fukuoka.

Lines 

Chikuhō Electric Railroad
Chikuhō Electric Railroad Line

Platforms

Adjacent stations

Surrounding area
 Applied Kurosaki store
 Frespo Kurosaki
 Kumanishi Junior High School
 Tsutsui Elementary School
 Aoyama Elementary School
 Yahatahagiwara Post Office
 Aoyamachūōgeka Hospital
 Anoo Park
 Kogasaki Park

Railway stations in Fukuoka Prefecture
Railway stations in Japan opened in 1914